This article contains lists of plants found in the state of Colima, Mexico.

Cupressaceae

Cupressus
Cupressus lusitanica:  Mexican white cedar, or Cedar-of-Goa

Pinaceae

Abies
Abies religiosa: Sacred Fir or Oyamel

Pinus
Pinus pseudostrobus: Chamite or Pachingo

Angiospermae

Aquifoliaceae

Ilex
Ilex tolucana: Ivy

Araliaceae

Oreopanax
Oreopanax xalapensis:

Betulaceae

Alnus
Alnus jorullensis: Aile

Fagaceae

Quercus
Quercus laurina: Encino laurelillo

Pentaphylacacaeae

Ternstroemia
Ternstroemia lineata:

Rosaceae

Prunus
Prunus serótina: Black Cherry

Salicaceae

Salix
Salix paradoxa: Willow

Pentaphylacacaeae

Ternstroemia
Ternstroemia lineata:

Plants
Colima